John Willes (1778 – 5 August 1852) was an English cricketer who, although he played in only five first-class cricket matches, had a significant impact on the game's history and development. Willes played for Kent county cricket teams and was a fast bowler who had a "pivotal" role in the development of roundarm bowling.

Willes was born at Headcorn in Kent in 1778 and christened at Hollingbourne on 17 August. He was the son of John and Sarah Willes and became a prominent landowner in Kent and Sussex. He lived for much of his life at Sutton Valence.

Willes played for the Gentlemen in the first two Gentlemen v Players matches in 1806.

Arthur Haygarth wrote in Scores & Biographies that Willes was "...the originator, or rather the reviver, of round-armed bowling, and is said (though his daughter has never heard of the fact) to have caught the idea from seeing his sister so deliver the ball to him in practice when he was unwell.  The Cricket Field, however, speaking through William Beldham, states: Willes was not the inventor of that kind of round bowling—he only revived what was forgotten or new to the young folk.  Whether he bowled round in the present match, cannot now be said, as this kind of delivery was not tolerated till about 1827, when it was permanently established by William Lillywhite, Jem Broadbridge and Mr George T Knight. In the MCC v Kent match on 15 July 1822, Mr Willes commenced playing for his county but, being no-balled, he threw down the ball in high dudgeon, left the ground immediately, and (it is said) never played again.  Mr Willes was also a great sportsman, and kept a pack of hounds at Sutton.  This place, shortly before his death, he was obliged to leave, and he removed to Staunton, near Gloucester, where he died, in fearfully reduced circumstances on 5 August 1852, aged 74.  No tombstone has been erected to his memory".

In fact, as Beldham confirmed, roundarm bowling was first devised back in Hambledon days by bowlers such as Tom Walker, although he was barred from using it in matches by the club.

After Willes quit the game, his cause was taken up by Knight in particular and the style was used to great effect by Lillywhite and Broadbridge who were generally considered the two best bowlers in England during the 1820s.  Roundarm was the subject of trial matches in 1827 but not actually legalised until 1835, though in the meantime the umpires turned a blind eye.

Notes

References

External links

1778 births
1852 deaths
English cricketers
Gentlemen cricketers
Kent cricketers
English cricketers of 1787 to 1825